This article provides a list of multiple Olympic medalists, i.e. those athletes who have won multiple Olympic medals at either the Summer Olympic Games or the Winter Olympic Games.

List of Olympic medals over career

This list includes athletes who have won seven or more Olympic medals over their sporting career. It includes top-three placings in the 1896 Olympic Games and 1900 Olympic Games, before medals were actually awarded for those placings. Medals won in the 1906 Intercalated Games are not included.
For simplicity, when an athlete has won medals for more than one nation, their entry in this list only mentions the last Nation represented. The Years listed for each athlete only include the Games in which they won medals. More detailed information is provided in the linked articles for the individual athletes.

In cases where two or more athletes have the same number of total medals, the first tiebreaker is the number of gold medals, followed by the number of silver medals. If the tied athletes have exactly the same number of gold, silver and bronze medals, the ranking is given as a tie and the athletes are listed in order first by career years and then alphabetically by surname.

Timeline
This is a progressive list of Olympians that have held the record for most medals won. Medals won in the 1906 Intercalated Games are not included. It includes top-three placings in 1896 and 1900, before medals were awarded for top-three placings. All record-holders have competed at Summer Games rather than Winter Games.

Legend: G = Gold, S = Silver, B = Bronze

List of most career medals in individual events
This list contains only medals won in individual events, so no relays or team events count for this section.

Athletes with medals in different disciplines

In the Summer and Winter Games

 Gillis Grafström became the first person to win a medal in the same event in Summer and Winter Olympics, winning figure skating golds at the 1920 Olympics and at the first Winter Olympics in 1924.
 Eddie Eagan became the first person to win a medal in the Winter Olympics and in the Summer Olympics in different events. He is the only Summer and Winter medalist to win gold medals in different events.
 Christa Luding-Rothenburger is the only person to win medals at the Winter and Summer Games in the same year. (This feat is no longer possible due to the staggering of the Winter and Summer Olympic years).  She is also the first person to win medals in successive Winter and Summer Games or vice versa.
 Clara Hughes is the first person to win multiple medals in both Summer and Winter Games and holds the highest number of medals of any Olympian to win medals in both the Summer and Winter Games.

In the Summer Games

Swimming and water polo

Others in Summer Games
  (athletics and rugby)
  (athletics and tennis)
  (indoor volleyball and beach volleyball)
  (swimming and fencing)
  Carl Schuhmann (GER) (gymnastics and wrestling)
  (cycling and rowing)
  (swimming and handball)
  (shooting and sculpture)
  (swimming and architecture)
  (rowing and sailing)
  (gymnastics and shooting)
  (gymnastics and shooting)
  (gymnastics and equestrian)
  Fritz Hofmann (GER) (gymnastics and athletics)
  (gymnastics and tug of war). But one of these at the unofficial 1906 Summer Olympics
  (modern pentathlon and fencing)

In the Winter Games

Cross-country skiing and Nordic combined

Others in Winter Games
  (biathlon and cross-country skiing)
  (luge and bobsleigh)
  (luge and bobsleigh)
  (long track speed skating and short track speed skating)
  (long track speed skating and short track speed skating)
  (alpine skiing and snowboarding)

See also
List of multiple Olympic medalists at a single Games
List of multiple Olympic medalists in one event
List of multiple Olympic gold medalists
List of multiple Olympic gold medalists at a single Games
List of multiple Olympic gold medalists in one event
List of multiple Summer Olympic medalists
List of multiple Winter Olympic medalists
List of athletes with the most appearances at Olympic Games
All-time Olympic Games medal table
Leonidas of Rhodes

References

 
 
 See also references in the articles on each athlete.

Olympic Games medal tables